The Istanbul Book Fair (Turkish: İstanbul Kitap Fuarı) is Turkey's largest book event, held annually since 1982.

References

External links

 Istanbul Book Fair official website

Culture in Istanbul
Trade fairs in Turkey
Book fairs in Turkey
Recurring events established in 1982
Annual events in Turkey
1982 establishments in Turkey